John Joseph Smith (born John Joseph Coffey, August 8, 1893 – December 4, 1962) was an American Major League Baseball third baseman who played in one game for the Detroit Tigers on May 18, 1912. Smith was one of several local sandlot players that the Tigers played that day after the regular Tigers players went on strike to protest the suspension of star center fielder Ty Cobb.

External links

1893 births
1962 deaths
Detroit Tigers players
Major League Baseball third basemen
Baseball players from Trenton, New Jersey